Filomena Cautela (born 16 December 1984) is a Portuguese television presenter and actress. Cautela started her acting career in the theatre in the year 2000. In 2004, she made her debut in cinema, and in 2005, she was cast as a presenter by MTV Portugal.

Career
Filomena continued acting for both theatre and cinema whilst her television presenter career took her to different TV stations and new shows. She has been hosting the late prime talk show 5 Para A Meia-Noite on RTP since 2015. Among other projects she was the Green Room presenter on the Portuguese national final for the Eurovision Song Contest, Festival da Canção in 2017, and was the Portuguese jury spokesperson in the Eurovision Song Contest 2017.

On 8 January 2018, she was announced as one of the four hosts of the Eurovision Song Contest 2018 alongside Sílvia Alberto, Daniela Ruah, and Catarina Furtado. It was confirmed on 4 May 2018 that Cautela would host the green room.

Filmography

Television

See also
 List of Eurovision Song Contest presenters

References

External links

 

1984 births
Living people
Portuguese actresses
Portuguese television presenters
Actresses from Lisbon
Portuguese women television presenters
Golden Globes (Portugal) winners